Paadhukaappu is a 1970 Indian Tamil-language film, directed by A. Bhimsingh and produced by A. Bhimsingh. The film stars Sivaji Ganesan, Jayalalithaa, T. S. Balaiah and Major Sundarrajan.

Cast 
Sivaji Ganesan as Kanthan
Jayalalithaa as Valli
Sowcar Janaki as Parvathi
Major Sundarrajan as Vaiyapuri (Kanthan's father)
M. N. Nambiar as Vinayagam (Kanthan's brother)
S. V. Subbaiah as (Guest Role)
T. S. Balaiah as Chinnathambi (Valli's husband)
J. P. Chandrababu
Nagesh
Thengai Srinivasan (Guest Role)
A. Karunanidhi
C. T. Rajakantham
C. K. Saraswathi
Senthamarai
Karikol Raju
K. R. Indira Devi

Soundtrack 
The music was composed by M. S. Viswanathan.

Reception 
The Indian Express panned the film, particularly the direction.

References

External links 
 

1970 films
1970s Tamil-language films
Films directed by A. Bhimsingh
Films scored by M. S. Viswanathan